Frédérique Hoschedé (born 14 July 1953 in Paris), better known by the stage name Dorothée, is a French singer and television presenter. She was a continuity announcer on French public broadcaster Antenne 2 from 1977 to 1983, but she is best known for having presented children's television shows like Les mercredis de la jeunesse (Youth Wednesdays, 1973), Dorothée et ses amis (Dorothée and Friends, 1977–1978), Récré A2 (A2 Break Time, 1978–1987), and especially Club Dorothée (1987–1997), which totalled up to about 30 hours of broadcast per week and popularized Japanese animation in France (with titles like Dragon Ball, Saint Seiya, City Hunter or Hokuto no Ken, sparking controversy and complaints from the CSA as well as some political figures for their violent content).

She is also a singer with a large discography (one album per year on average between 1980 and 1996), singing pop music for children, and she has also recorded the best-known French traditional nursery rhymes in a record collection called Le jardin des chansons (The Garden of Songs). Several of her songs were used for the openings of animated series featured in Club Dorothée (including "Candy" and "Sophie et Virginie"). One of her trademarks is that each of her albums, from Hou ! la menteuse in 1982 to Dorothée 2010, featured a song with the word "valise" (suitcase) in its title, with a similar melody but a different arrangement and partially updated lyrics, totalling 16 "valise" songs.

Between 1990 and 1996, Dorothée did 56 shows at the Palais Omnisports de Paris-Bercy (now called AccorHotels Arena), still the record for a female artist and the third-highest total number of concerts in this venue behind Michel Sardou and Johnny Hallyday. In addition, her 1992 tour attracted more people in France than Johnny Hallyday and Michael Jackson, earning her a "Fauteuil d'Or" award for more than 500,000 tickets sold.

Later in her musical career, Dorothée developed a particular interest in early rock music. In 1993 and 1994, she presented three special prime-time shows called Dorothée Rock'n'roll Show, in which she sang duets with major rock and roll and rhythm and blues artists including Ray Charles, Chuck Berry, Cliff Richard, Henri Salvador, Percy Sledge, Screamin' Jay Hawkins, and Jerry Lee Lewis, with whom she sang "Great Balls of Fire", which also featured on her album Une histoire d'amour (1992). Her 1994 album Nashville Tennessee was recorded in the titular city of Nashville, in the recording studio made famous by Elvis Presley and Bill Haley.

Dorothée had a brief stint in cinema, appearing in three movies between 1979 and 1980, including a prominent role in L'amour en fuite by François Truffaut. She also made a cameo appearance in the 2019 live action Nicky Larson movie.

Discography

Albums

 1980 : Dorothée au pays des chansons
 1981 : Dorothée & les récré amis chantent
 1981 : Candy raconte à Dorothée
 1982 : Hou ! la menteuse
 1983 : Pour faire une chanson
 1983 : Les Schtroumpfs
 1984 : Qu'il est bête! (certified gold)
 1984 : Schtroumpfs parade
 1985 : Allô Allô M. l'Ordinateur (certified gold)
 1986 : Maman (certified gold)
 1987 : Docteur
 1988 : Attention Danger (certified platinum)
 1989 : Tremblement de terre (2x certified gold)
 1990 : Live à Bercy
 1990 : Chagrin d'amour (certified gold)
 1991 : Les neiges de l'Himalaya
 1992 : Une histoire d'amour 
 1993 : Bercy 93
 1993 : 2394
 1994 : Nashville Tennessee
 1995 : Bonheur City
 1996 : La Honte de la famille
 2010 : Dorothée 2010

Compilations

 1980 : Les feuilletons de Récré A2
 1982 : Les feuilletons de Récré A2 (2nd edition)
 1988 : Les super chansons
 1990 : Top Dorothée
 1994 : Cristal
 1997 : 15 ans d'amour
 1998 : Le jardin des chansons
 2004 : Les plus belles chansons (2nd edition of 15 ans d'amour)
 2006 : Dorothée BERCY
 2016 : Dorothée : L'essentiel (Best of + 7 unreleased songs)

Main singles

 1980 : "Musique magique"
 1981 : "Tchou ! Tchou ! Le petit train"
 1981 : "Rox & Rouky" 
 1982 : "Enfin récré A2 !"
 1982 : "Hou la menteuse / La valise" (SNEP: Silver)
 1983 : "Pour faire une chanson"
 1983 : "Les Schtroumpfs" (certified platinum)
 1984 : "Qu'il est bête !"
 1984 : "Les petits Ewoks"
 1985 : "Vive les vacances"
 1985 : "Allô Allô M. l'Ordinateur" (SNEP: Silver)
 1986 : "Tant qu'on a des amis"
 1986 : "Maman" (SNEP: Silver)
 1987 : "Où se cache l'amour"
 1987 : "Le sourire du dragon" (French opening theme of Dungeons and Dragons)
 1987 : "La chanson des Ewoks"
 1987 : "Docteur"
 1988 : "La chanson de Candy"
 1988 : "Attention danger"
 1989 : "La machine avalé"
 1989 : "Tremblement de terre" 
 1990 : "Nicolas & Marjolaine"
 1990 : "Chagrin d'amour"
 1991 : "Un jour on se retrouvera"
 1991 : "Valise Ninety One"
 1991 : "Les neiges de l'Himalaya" 
 1992 : "Le collège des cœurs brisés"
 1992 : "Où est le garçon"
 1992 : "Une histoire d'amour"
 1993 : "Toutes les guitares du rock'n'roll"
 1993 : "Bats-toi"
 1993 : "Il faut chanter"
 1993 : "2394"
 1994 : "Si j'ai menti"
 1994 : "Chanson pour un garçon"
 1994 : "Non non-ne dis pas"
 1995 : "Folle de vous"
 1995 : "Des millions de copains"
 1995 : "Bonheur City"
 1996 : "Je rêve"
 1996 : "La honte de la famille"
 1997 : "Toutes les chansons du monde"
 2006 : "Hou la menteuse remix" (certified silver)
 2006 : "La valise remix"
 2006 : "Allô, allô M. l'Ordinateur remix"
 2010 : "Coup de tonnerre"
 2010 : "À l'Olympia"

Greatest hits

Concerts 

 Zénith 86 – Zénith Paris from 13 December 1986 to 4 January 1987, followed by a tour from 30 January to 31 May 1987.
 Zénith 87 – Zénith Paris on 12 December 1987, followed by a tour from 21 November to 27 December 1987.
 Zénith 88 –Zénith Paris from 26 November to 18 December 1988, followed by a tour from 18 January to 3 April 1989.
 Bercy 90 – Paris-Bercy from 6 to 21 January 1990, followed by a tour from 24 February to 7 April 1990.
 Tournée 91 – Tour in France from 31 March to 21 April 1991, then in La Réunion in May 1991.
 Chine 90 / Chine 91 – Tours in China, in May 1990 et May 1991.
 Bercy 92 – Paris-Bercy from 18 January to 2 February 1992, followed by a tour from 6 February to 23 June 1992 in 50 French cities, Belgium, Switzerland and DOM-TOM.
 Bercy 93 – Paris-Bercy from 2 to 6 January 1993, followed by a tour from 18 to 23 December 1992 and from 17 March to 18 April 1993 (France, La Réunion, Mauritius).
 Bercy 94 – Paris-Bercy from 15 to 26 January 1994, followed by a tour in France from 29 January to 30 March 1994.
 DOM-TOM 94 – Tour in the DOM-TOM in November 1994.
 Zénith 96 – Zénith Paris from 13 to 17 January 1996.
 Bercy 96 – Paris-Bercy from 4 to 15 December 1996.
 Olympia 2010 – Olympia de Paris from 17 to 19 April 2010.
 Bercy 2010 – Paris-Bercy on 18 December 2010.
 Total Olympia: 42 shows
 Total Zénith: 54 shows
 Total Bercy: 58 shows

Film 

 1979 : L'Amour en fuite by François Truffaut : Sabine Barnerias
 1979 : La Gueule de l'autre by Pierre Tchernia : the television announcer
 1980 : Pile ou Face by Robert Enrico : Laurence Bertil
 2019 : Nicky Larson et le Parfum de Cupidon by Philippe Lacheau : cameo

References

Bibliography

External links

 

1953 births
Living people
French television presenters
Actresses from Paris
Musicians from Paris
20th-century French actresses
21st-century French actresses
21st-century French singers
French film actresses
French television actresses
French voice actresses
French children's musicians
20th-century French women singers
21st-century French women singers
French women television presenters